Mary Opeloge (born 24 January 1992) is a Samoan weightlifter. She competed in the women's 75 kg event at the 2014 Commonwealth Games where she won a silver medal. She won Gold at the 2016 Oceania Weightlifting Championships.

She competed at the 2016 Summer Olympics in Rio de Janeiro. She finished in 11th place in the women's 75 kg event. She was the flagbearer for Samoa during the opening ceremony.

Personal life 
Mary is the younger sister of Ele & Niusila Opeloge who are Commonwealth Gold medalists. She also has two other brothers who are also weightlifters.

References

External links
 

1992 births
Living people
Samoan female weightlifters
Commonwealth Games silver medallists for Samoa
Weightlifters at the 2014 Commonwealth Games
Weightlifters at the 2016 Summer Olympics
Olympic weightlifters of Samoa
Commonwealth Games medallists in weightlifting
Medallists at the 2014 Commonwealth Games